is a train station in Nakamura-ku, Nagoya, Aichi Prefecture, Japan.

Lines

 (Station number: H07)

Layout

Platforms

There are two main exits, the East Exit, which leads to Exit 2 and Exit 3, and the West Exit, which leads to Exit 1 and Exit 4.  Exit 1 and 4 are closed after 11 pm and before 6 am.  The East Exit two up escalators, one for each platform, but only the escalator for Exit 3 supports wheelchairs.  The West Exit has two escalators, one for each platform, and they both support wheelchairs.  The two platforms are Platform 1, with trains bound for Nagoya Station, Sakae Station, and Fujigaoka Station, and Platform 2, with trains bound for Nakamura Koen Station and Takabata Station.  There are station staff at the gates of the East Exit.  There is currently no elevator but one is under construction, and because of that, Exit 4 has been closed since December 1 of 2001 and is planned to re-open on March 15 of 2011.  There are bathrooms near Exit 2.  Both the East Exit and West Exit have a public telephone.

Points of Interest 

Near the station are GEO, a video rental store, and Noritake Gardens, the official museum of Noritake.

References

External links

 Kamejima Station's web page at the Nagoya Transportation Bureau's web site 

Railway stations in Japan opened in 1969
Railway stations in Aichi Prefecture